Clarke Glacier  is a -wide, -long glacier, located on the west coast of Graham Land in Antarctica.  It flows west, along the north side of Sickle Mountain and the Baudin Peaks, to Mikkelsen Bay.

It was first surveyed in 1936 by the British Graham Land expedition (BGLE) (1934-1937) under John Rymill.  In January 1941, it was traversed near its head by a United States Antarctic Service (USAS) sledge party.  The lower reaches of the glacier were surveyed in 1948-1949 by the Falkland Islands Dependencies Survey (FIDS), who named the glacier (decision year 1955).

The glacier was named for Louis C. G. Clarke, director of the Fitzwilliam Museum, Cambridge from 1937 to 1946, who "greatly assisted the BGLE."

See also
 List of glaciers in the Antarctic
 Geography of Antarctica
 Geology of Antarctica
 Glaciology

References 
This article incorporates text in the public domain from the United States Department of the Interior.

External links 

Glaciers of Fallières Coast